Tress may refer to:

People
Arthur Tress (born 1940), American photographer
David Tress (born 1955), British artist
Kyle Tress (born 1940), American skeleton racer
Mike Tress (1909-1967), national president of Agudath Israel of America
Oliver Tress (born 1967), British businessman, founder of Oliver Bonas
Ronald Tress (1915-2006), British professor and director
Tress Bucyanayandi, Ugandan agriculturalist and politician
Tress MacNeille (born 1951), American voice actress

Other
Tress 90 (1990-1996), meant as the replacement for INFOTRYGD, a case-worker support system, the largest IT failure in Norwegian history.
Ladies'-tresses, a genus of orchids 
Autumn Ladies'-tresses, the latest-blooming native species of orchid
Tress Shop, Kentucky, an unincorporated community located in Todd County, Kentucky, United States.